Lymphocyte-specific protein 1 is a protein that in humans is encoded by the LSP1 gene.

This gene encodes an intracellular F-actin binding protein. The protein is expressed in lymphocytes, neutrophils, macrophages, and endothelium and may regulate neutrophil motility, adhesion to fibrinogen matrix proteins, and transendothelial migration. Alternative splicing results in multiple transcript variants encoding different isoforms.

References

Further reading